The Church of the Blessed Sacrament is a Roman Catholic parish church in the Roman Catholic Archdiocese of New York, located at Forest Avenue at Manor Road, Staten Island, New York City, in the neighborhood of West New Brighton, Staten Island. The parish was established in 1910.

Buildings
The church was built in 1952 to the designs of prolific church building architect Robert J. Reiley of Robert J. Reiley & Associates for $175,000

References 

Christian organizations established in 1910
Roman Catholic churches in Staten Island
Robert J. Reiley church buildings
Roman Catholic churches completed in 1953
20th-century Roman Catholic church buildings in the United States